Haley Joel Osment (born April 10, 1988) is an American actor and voice actor. Beginning his career as a child actor, Osment's role in the comedy-drama film Forrest Gump (1994) won him a Young Artist Award. His breakthrough came with the psychological thriller film The Sixth Sense (1999), which won him a Saturn Award and earned him nominations for an Academy Award, a Golden Globe Award and a Screen Actors Guild Award. He achieved further success with the drama film Pay It Forward (2000), the science fiction film A.I. Artificial Intelligence (2001) which won him a second Saturn Award, and the comedy film Secondhand Lions (2003), which won him a Critics Choice Award.

Osment has had a long-running role in the Kingdom Hearts video game franchise, voicing the series' protagonist Sora (2002–present) and one of its villains Vanitas (2010–2020) in the English versions of the games. He has sporadically appeared on-screen since his Secondhand Lions role, recognizably appearing in Sex Ed (2014) and The Spoils of Babylon (2014). He made his Broadway debut in 2008 in a short-lived revival of David Mamet's play American Buffalo, starring John Leguizamo and Cedric the Entertainer.

Early life and education
Osment was born in Los Angeles, California, the son of Theresa (née Seifert), a teacher, and Michael Eugene Osment, a theater and film actor, both natives of Birmingham, Alabama. Osment was raised Roman Catholic. He has one sibling, actress Emily Osment, who is four years younger. Osment's parents have described his childhood as a "good old-fashioned Southern upbringing". His father said that when Osment was learning to speak, he deliberately avoided using baby talk when communicating with his son.

Osment was a student at Flintridge Preparatory School in La Cañada Flintridge, California. As a child, he wrestled and played basketball, football, and golf.

He graduated from New York University's Tisch School of the Arts in 2011.

Career
Visiting a store at age four, Osment signed up with a talent scout. Called back for an audition, he was asked to describe the biggest thing he had ever seen; his description of an IMAX theater screen helped win him a part in a Pizza Hut TV commercial. The commercial launched his career, and later that year he starred in the ABC TV sitcom Thunder Alley, his first role in series television. His first feature film role was as Forrest Gump's son, also named Forrest Gump, in the 1994 film of the same name. He also had a small part in another 1994 film, Mixed Nuts. Throughout the rest of the 1990s, Osment played regular or recurring roles in various TV series; including The Jeff Foxworthy Show and the final season of Murphy Brown, where he replaced Dyllan Christopher as Murphy's son, Avery.

In addition, he made numerous guest appearances on shows, including The Larry Sanders Show, Walker, Texas Ranger, Touched by an Angel, Chicago Hope, The Pretender, and Ally McBeal. He appeared in the 1996 film Bogus, alongside Whoopi Goldberg and Gérard Depardieu and the 1998 television film The Lake, as well as I'll Remember April (1999), with future The Sixth Sense co-star Trevor Morgan.

Osment first achieved stardom in 1999, when he appeared in The Sixth Sense, co-starring Bruce Willis. For his portrayal of Cole Sear, a psychic child, Osment won the Saturn Award for Best Performance by a Younger Actor. He was also nominated for the Academy Award for Best Supporting Actor, becoming the second-youngest performer ever to receive an Academy nomination for a supporting role, but lost the final Oscar vote to Michael Caine (with whom he would later work, appearing together in Secondhand Lions). One of Osment's lines in The Sixth Sense, "I see dead people," became a popular catchphrase and is often repeated or parodied on television programs and in other media. The phrase is #44 on the American Film Institute's list of 100 Movie Quotes. He made three minor appearances on the animated TV series Family Guy in 2000 and 2001.

The 2000 Academy Awards ceremony honored another future co-star, Kevin Spacey, who, along with Helen Hunt, appeared in Osment's next film, Pay It Forward (2000). The following year, he appeared in Steven Spielberg's A.I. Artificial Intelligence, cementing his stature as one of the leading young actors in Hollywood. This role earned him his second Saturn Award for Best Younger Actor, and further critical acclaim. In reviewing the film, critic Roger Ebert claimed that: "Osment, who is onscreen in almost every scene, is one of the best actors now working". In 2001, Osment starred in the Polish film, Edges of the Lord, as Romek. The film was never released theatrically in the United States. Between 2002 and 2003, Osment lent his voice to films such as The Country Bears, The Hunchback of Notre Dame II and The Jungle Book 2, all from Walt Disney Pictures. He returned to live action with the 2003 film, Secondhand Lions.

Osment lent his voice to the video game series Kingdom Hearts, providing the voice of Sora, the series' main character, and also Vanitas, a villain from the same series. Osment also voiced the character of Takeshi Jin in the English version of the Immortal Grand Prix anime television series.

He appeared in Home of the Giants, playing a high school journalist opposite Ryan Merriman and Danielle Panabaker. He subsequently worked on Montana Amazon as both an actor and executive producer. The film starred Olympia Dukakis and debuted at the Orlando and Big Apple Film Festivals in November 2010, winning Best Feature Film at the latter.

Osment made his Broadway debut at the Belasco Theatre in November 2008 playing the role of Bobby, a young heroin addict, in a revival of David Mamet's American Buffalo; co-starring with John Leguizamo and Cedric the Entertainer. The show opened to mixed reviews, and a provisional statement was made on November 20, 2008, that it would close after the first week.

In 2010, Osment signed for a leading role in the comedy film Sex Ed from MPCA, to play a college graduate who wants to teach geometry, but ends up as a sex education teacher while inexperienced himself. In January 2011, Entertainment Weekly reported that Osment had joined the cast of Sassy Pants, a comedy about a homeschooler with an overbearing mother.

Variety reported on June 27, 2011, that Osment would star in Wake the Dead, a modern-day retelling of the Frankenstein story, with production to begin the last quarter of 2011. As of mid-2014, no published status was available.

In 2013, he appeared in a series of episodes of Amazon's Alpha House. He also co-starred in the Will Ferrell and Adam McKay-produced comedy melodrama miniseries The Spoils of Babylon and The Spoils Before Dying for IFC. Kevin Smith has further added to Osment's career resurgence with roles in the first two films of his True North Trilogy, first as Teddy Craft in Tusk and next as a fictionalized version of Canadian journalist Adrien Arcand in Yoga Hosers.

In 2017, Osment held a recurring role in season 4 of HBO's Silicon Valley as VR expert and tech financier Keenan Feldspar. Also in 2017, Osment made an appearance on BBC America's Top Gear America as one of the guests in the fourth episode of season 1.

In 2019, Osment had a supporting role in the Netflix film Extremely Wicked, Shockingly Evil and Vile, starring alongside Lily Collins whose character Liz follows the prosecution of Ted Bundy, played by Zac Efron. Osment also appeared as the character Mesmer in the Amazon series The Boys, and as Dr. Stu Camillo in the Seth Rogen and Evan Goldberg produced Hulu series Future Man.

Personal life
Osment plays the guitar and piano.

He is an avid golfer who began playing at the age of seven. He played for the U.S. team in the All-Star Cup 2005, under team leader Mark O'Meara, and has participated in the annual Michael Douglas & Friends Celebrity Golf Tournament.

In 2006, Osment suffered a broken rib and fractured shoulder blade in an auto accident. He pleaded no contest to driving under the influence of alcohol and misdemeanor drug possession and was sentenced to three years' probation, 60 hours in an alcohol rehabilitation and education program, a fine of $1,500, and attendance at Alcoholics Anonymous.

 he was living in New York City.

Filmography

Film

Television

Video games

References

External links

1988 births
20th-century American male actors
21st-century American male actors
American male child actors
American male film actors
American male television actors
American male video game actors
American male voice actors
Living people
Male actors from Los Angeles
Tisch School of the Arts alumni
Disney people